Helen Chu may refer to:

 Chu Fong-chi (born 1948), Taiwanese politician
 Helen Y. Chu, American immunologist